William Franklin Goodling (December 5, 1927 – September 17, 2017) was a Republican member of the U.S. House of Representatives from Pennsylvania. At the time of his death, he was the Chairman of the Board of the Goodling Institute for Research in Family Literacy.

Biography
Goodling, the son of former Congressman George Atlee Goodling, was born in Loganville, Pennsylvania and grew up in York, Pennsylvania. He received a B.S. from the University of Maryland in 1953, a Masters in Education from Western Maryland College in 1957, and undertook doctoral studies at the Pennsylvania State University, from 1958 to 1963. He held various teaching and administrative positions throughout the State of Pennsylvania. Goodling served in the United States Army from 1946 to 1948. He served on the Dallastown area school board and was president of the school board. Goodling died on September 17, 2017.

Political career
Goodling was elected to Congress as a Republican in 1974. He was implicated in the House banking scandal in 1992. After his party took over a majority in the House in January 1995, he served as Chairman of the United States House Committee on Education and Labor (then called the Committee on Economic and Educational Opportunities or the Committee on Education and the Workforce). He retired from public service in 2001.

References

External links

The Political Graveyard

The Goodling Institute
Bill Goodling's Congressional Votes at the Washington Post
 official U.S. House website (archived)

1927 births
2017 deaths
Educators from Pennsylvania
School board members in Pennsylvania
Politicians from York, Pennsylvania
University of Maryland, College Park alumni
Military personnel from Pennsylvania
United States Army soldiers
Western Maryland College alumni
Pennsylvania State University alumni
Republican Party members of the United States House of Representatives from Pennsylvania
Members of Congress who became lobbyists